Line 2 (Linea Due in Italian), is a subway line serving Milan, Italy, operated by ATM as part of the Milan Metro. It is also called the Green Line, (Linea Verde in Italian), as it is visually identified by green signs.

The line runs from the southern to the north-eastern neighborhoods passing through the city centre, serving the north-eastern metropolitan area with two different branches. Line 2 is the longest line of the Milan Metro and is the only one running partially overground. The branch to Cologno Nord runs mostly on viaducts, while those to Assago and Gessate run on the surface.

The line has the southernmost and easternmost stations on the network (Assago Forum and Gessate).

History

The first part of the line, from Caiazzo to Cascina Gobba, was opened on September 1969.

The interurban sections of Line 2 were originally built as part of a fast tramway, the Linee celeri dell'Adda ("Adda fast lines"), opened in 1968 from Cimiano up to Gorgonzola. After few years, in 1972, the section was included in the newly born Metro line. The same section was extended in 1985 up to Gessate, the present terminus.

Route
The North branch runs from Cologno Sud to Cologno Nord, the North-East branch runs from Vimodrone to Gessate, the South-East branch consists of the Abbiategrasso station, the South branch runs from Assago Milanofiori Nord to Assago Milanofiori Forum.

Rolling stock
There are 2 types of trains in service on the line. The first type is the ET245, which was introduced in 1969 with the opening of the line and was the first train operated on Line 2. ET245 are formed by three-car consists, with Bo-Bo powered units at both ends and a car between them; normally, two consists are coupled to form a single train.
This series came in two different versions for urban and suburban routes. The first had 8 doors per car and regular seats, while the latter was equipped with only 6 doors per car and more seats.
Original ET245 trains are still in service on the line. Of these, some have been renewed in latest years.

The second type in operation is the new AnsaldoBreda Meneghino train. The first train was introduced in April 2009. In 2015, the  followed, with the two newer series jointly replacing all the other stock, which is due to be retired by 2020.

Originally, as its own trains were not ready yet, Line 2 provisionally operated with 100/200 Series trains transferred from Line 1. 
As the 300/400 Series trains were delivered starting from 1970, the 100/200 Series trains were moved back to line 1.
The three-doors 300/400 Series trains were manufactured between 1970 and 1981, and in 1985 the 350 Series was introduced, which was an improved version of the earlier 300 Series with four doors instead of three. 350 Series trains were produced in 2 batches between 1985 and 1991. In 1987 the 500 Series was introduced, consisting of three experimental trains designed to test the new GTO–VVVF inverters that were to equip Line 3's 8000 Series.

Planned extensions
An extension on the north from Cologno to Vimercate is planned.

Notes

Bibliography 
 Giorgio Meregalli: Gli impianti ferroviari della linea 2 della metropolitana di Milano. In: ″Ingegneria Ferroviaria″, May 1971, p. 469–492.

References
Milan Metro Network Map
Milan Metro in Figures

2
Railway lines opened in 1969